Bakary Sissoko (born 11 January 1998) is a French professional footballer who plays as a defender for JA Drancy, on loan Troyes AC.

Professional career
Sissoko made his professional debut with Troyes AC in a 4–2 Coupe de France loss to AJ Auxerre on 8 January 2017. On 23 May 2018, Sissoko signed his first professional contract with Troyes, keeping him at the club for three years.
In January 2019 he was loaned to JA Drancy.

Personal life
Born in France, Sissoko is of Malian descent.

References

External links
 
 
 ESTAC Profile

1998 births
Living people
People from Sèvres
Footballers from Hauts-de-Seine
Association football defenders
French footballers
French people of Malian descent
ES Troyes AC players
JA Drancy players
Ligue 2 players
Championnat National players
Championnat National 2 players
Championnat National 3 players